Nyx is a genus of moths in the family Choreutidae.

Species
Nyx puyaphaga Heppner, 1982
Nyx viscachensis Beeche, 1998

References

Millieriidae